Cory Morrow (born May 1, 1972 in Houston, Texas) is a Texas Country singer-songwriter who has gained popularity throughout the Southwest.

Biography 
Morrow was born May 1, 1972 in Houston, Texas. He started playing guitar at Memorial High School in Houston and continued to develop as a musician while attending Texas Tech University, where he was a member of the Phi Gamma Delta fraternity.

In 1993, Morrow moved to Austin, Texas to pursue music as a career. He is also considered part of the Red Dirt music scene, that differentiates itself from the popular Nashville music scene. Morrow has sold over 200,000 albums independently. Morrow's 2002 release Outside the Lines reached No. 28 on Billboard's Country Album chart, No. 3 on the magazine's Internet Sales chart, No. 8 on its Independent Album chart and No. 16 on Heatseekers chart. SoundScan ranked him No. 7 among "country debut artists" that year.

Discography

Albums

Singles

Music videos

References

External links
Cory Morrow Official Site

American country singer-songwriters
Living people
Country musicians from Texas
Texas Tech University alumni
Musicians from Houston
1972 births
Singer-songwriters from Texas
21st-century American singers